The Maine is a Dubai-based New England Brasserie Company known for serving seafood and brasserie style dishes.

History
The Maine is owned by Pine Tree State Trading Co, a BVI company founded in 2014 by Canadian restaurateur Joey Ghazal. The name was coined from the State of Maine in New England, United States – a state famous for lobsters, clams, and other types of seafood.

Reception
The Maine won the 'Best Seafood Restaurant' award in the BBC's Good Food Middle East Awards in 2016. Dylan Esserter, writing for Conde Nast Traveller, included The Maine in his list of the 30 Best Restaurants in Dubai in 2018. It was ranked number 43 in Esquire Middle East's 'Best Restaurants 2019' list.

In 2019, the New England Brasserie opened a new brand named "Maine Street Eatery" in Dubai Studio City.

See also
 Tourist attractions in Dubai
 Brasserie

References

External links
 Maine Oyster Bar & Grill website
 Maine Street Eatery website

Restaurants in Dubai
French restaurants
Restaurants established in 2015
Emirati companies established in 2015
Oyster bars